The Bosmal City Center (BCC) (Bosnian, Croatian and Serbian: Bosmalov gradski centar / Босмалов градски центар) is a business and residential tower located in Sarajevo, Bosnia and Herzegovina. In addition to apartment units, the complex houses several amenities, including restaurants, salons, and shops.

The Bosmal City Center was the project of Bosnian firm Bosmal, created in 2001 by brothers Nihad and Edin Šabanović from Visoko. With an overall investment valued at €120 million, the Bosmal City Center is the largest direct foreign greenfield investment in Bosnia and Herzegovina. The project involved nearly seventy companies and employed more than 3,500 workers.

References

External links

Bosmal City Center on Sarajevo Construction portal

Buildings and structures in Sarajevo
Residential buildings in Bosnia and Herzegovina
Skyscraper office buildings in Bosnia and Herzegovina
Novi Grad, Sarajevo
Twin towers
Buildings and structures completed in 2001
Residential skyscrapers
Skyscrapers in Bosnia and Herzegovina
Retail buildings in Bosnia and Herzegovina